Dustin Long is an American novelist and author. He is known for his 2006 book Icelander.

Biography
Long studied English literature at the University of California, Berkeley, and is currently a Ph.D. student at Indiana University, Bloomington. Long has a son, and is a teacher in Manhattan. He currently lives in Brooklyn.

Career
Icelander, published in 2006, was Long's first novel. It appeared on the Los Angeles Times best-sellers list. Long published a second novel, Bad Teeth, in 2014.

Long cites Thomas Pynchon and David Foster Wallace as influences.

Works
Fiction
Icelander (2006, McSweeney's, Hardcover) (2007, Grove Press, Paperback)
Bad Teeth (2014, New Harvest)

References

External links
An HTMLGiant interview with Dustin Long (17 February 2012)
Dustin Long speaks with The Inside Flap
Laura Miller of Salon reviews Icelander
Review in the Montreal Mirror

Living people
McSweeney's
21st-century American novelists
American male novelists
21st-century American male writers
Year of birth missing (living people)